Mahfoud Ould Lemrabott was the Head of the Supreme Court of Mauritania. He died on 11 May 2013.

References

2013 deaths
Mauritanian jurists
Year of birth missing
Place of birth missing